Carlia rubigo, the orange-flanked rainbow-skink is a species of skink in the genus Carlia. It is endemic to Queensland, Australia.

References

Carlia
Reptiles described in 2012
Endemic fauna of Australia
Skinks of Australia
Taxa named by Conrad J. Hoskin
Taxa named by Patrick J. Couper